The Diademaceae are a family of fungi in the order Pleosporales. Taxa are widespread, especially in temperate regions, and are parasitic or saprobic in stem and leaves.

References

Pleosporales
Dothideomycetes families
Taxa described in 1992